Bloom Center is an unincorporated community in Logan County, in the U.S. state of Ohio.

History
Bloom Center was platted in 1852. A post office was established at Bloom Center in 1852, and remained in operation until 1905.

References

Unincorporated communities in Logan County, Ohio
1852 establishments in Ohio
Populated places established in 1852
Unincorporated communities in Ohio